SmartWeb may refer to:

Artificial intelligence software developed by the German Research Centre for Artificial Intelligence.
SmartWeb mobile, content-control software for Apple iPhone/iPod Touch.
An online grading system for United States schools.